Linard-Malval (Limousin: Linar e Malaval) is a commune in the Creuse department in the Nouvelle-Aquitaine region in central France. It was established on 1 January 2019 by merger of the former communes of Linard (the seat) and Malval.

See also
Communes of the Creuse department

References

Communes of Creuse